Raymond Lloyd “Red” Cariens (May 1, 1896 – December 1, 1925) was an American racing driver from Evansville, Indiana who competed in the AAA Championship Car series. He made his debut in 1924 at Altoona Speedway. He then was a relief driver for Bennett Hill in the 1925 Indianapolis 500.  Later that year he was killed in an accident during his second champ car start on the 1.25 mile (2.01 km) board oval in Culver City, California.

External links
Ray Cariens at ChampCarStats.com

1896 births
1925 deaths
Indianapolis 500 drivers
Racing drivers who died while racing
Sportspeople from Evansville, Indiana
Sports deaths in California
Racing drivers from Indiana
AAA Championship Car drivers